Jacques Auguste Chaudron (2 June 1889 – 16 June 1969) was a French ice hockey player. He competed in the men's tournament at the 1924 Winter Olympics.

References

1889 births
1969 deaths
Ice hockey people from Paris
Ice hockey players at the 1924 Winter Olympics
Olympic ice hockey players of France